Brennan Leon King (August 16, 1916 – December 5, 1978) was an American Negro league pitcher in the 1940s.

A native of Butte, Montana, King attended North Carolina A&T State University. He played for the Cincinnati Clowns in 1943, and for the Atlanta Black Crackers the following season. King died in Seattle, Washington in 1978 at age 62.

References

External links
 and Seamheads

1916 births
1978 deaths
Atlanta Black Crackers players
Cincinnati Clowns players
Baseball pitchers
Baseball players from Montana
Sportspeople from Butte, Montana
20th-century African-American sportspeople